Omed-omedan, also known as 'The Kissing Ritual', is a ceremony held by the young people of Banjar Kaja Sesetan, Denpasar, Bali.
The name is derived from the Balinese language and means pull-pull. It originates from a fight between a male and female pig and represents the push and pull of positive and negative elements.

History 
This ritual has been around for at least 100 years. Originally only the people of Banjar Kaja Sesetan village could participate. It is not clear when mass kissing was incorporated into the tradition, but it has become a ceremony for the youths of the village to express their joy on the first day of the new year.

Ceremony 

Omed-omedan involves unmarried youths with ages ranging from 17 to 30 years old. The procession begins with the youths praying together to invoke safety. After the prayer, the men and women separate. The groups face each other on the main street. With the signal of a Hindu leader, both sides approach the center of the road. Male participants pull and kiss the female participants while other villagers pour buckets of water over them.

This ceremony has become a meeting place for singles. Many couples have met through this tradition.

Omed-Omedan is held on the day after Nyepi or The Day of Silence, a day of reflection which prohibits lighting fires or using electricity, traveling or engaging in any form of entertainment.

References 

Ceremonies in Indonesia
Bali